Zeyn ol Din (also Romanized as Zeyn ol Dīn; also known as Zeyn od Din) is a village in Kenevist Rural District, in the Central District of Mashhad County, Razavi Khorasan Province, Iran. At the 2006 census, its population was 370, in 94 families.

References 

Populated places in Mashhad County